AREX is a South Korean railway line that links Seoul with Gimpo Airport and Incheon International Airport.

Arex may also refer to:

Arex (Star Trek character), a character from Star Trek: The Animated Series
 Administrative Records Experiment, a project designed to explore alternatives to the 2010 United States Census
 AREX - The Receivables Exchange, online marketplace for SME invoice financing

See also
 ARexx, an implementation of the REXX language for Commodore Amiga computers